The Benjamin Punchard House is a historic house in Andover, Massachusetts.  Located in the center of Andover, it now houses a bank. The house was built in 1846 by Benjamin Punchard, a successful merchant and shopkeeper.  Punchard built the house on the site of a Federal style house he had previously occupied, which was moved to 33 High Street, and is known as the Abiel Pearson House.  The house he designed has a number of distinctive characteristics, include a number of early Italianate details.  Punchard died a wealthy man, and the town's high school was named for him.

See also
National Register of Historic Places listings in Andover, Massachusetts
National Register of Historic Places listings in Essex County, Massachusetts

References

Houses in Andover, Massachusetts
National Register of Historic Places in Andover, Massachusetts
Houses on the National Register of Historic Places in Essex County, Massachusetts